Spiraprilat is the active metabolite of spirapril.

References

External links

ACE inhibitors
Human drug metabolites
Dithiolanes